Stew Nairn (5 September 1931 – 6 July 1991) was a New Zealand sports shooter. He competed in the 50 metre rifle, prone event at the 1968 Summer Olympics.

References

External links
 

1931 births
1991 deaths
New Zealand male sport shooters
Olympic shooters of New Zealand
Shooters at the 1968 Summer Olympics
Sportspeople from Wellington City